United States gubernatorial elections were held 6 November 1973, in two states.

In Virginia, former Governor Mills E. Godwin, Jr.,  who was elected in the 1965 gubernatorial election as a Democrat, ran and won as a Republican, defeating Howell, also a former Democrat.

In New Jersey, the moderate incumbent Republican Cahill was defeated in the primary by Sandman. Cahill did not campaign for Sandman, and Byrne defeated Sandman handily.

References 

 
November 1973 events in the United States